Interstate Highways in Oklahoma form a network of freeways that cross the state. Several of them incorporated existing or already-planned turnpikes and continue to be maintained by the Oklahoma Turnpike Authority.

References

External links
OKHighways by Eric Stuve

Interstate